The Laka Competition is an annual international architectural competition held by Laka Architektura. The competition has been created in order to search for innovative ideas of architecture that reacts in a way that is related to its social, environmental, technological, construction or material aspect.  In addition to the activity of the competition, the participants are provided with a blog platform that presents potential inspiration related to the topic of architecture reacting to human needs.

Competition outline 
The main inspiration for the competition are living organisms which respond and adapt to external stimuli. Laka Competition draws inspiration from the responsiveness of nature and looks for designs that are capable of dynamic adjustments, providing safety and comfort for their inhabitants.

Apart from the money prize offered as an award for the winners, in the next editions of the competition selected participants can be considered to be included in the Laka Accelerator for an additional prize of having their project financially and substantially supported in order to play a role in covering human needs as the "architecture that reacts".

2015 edition 
The first edition, run in 2015, gathered over 100 submissions and nearly 200 participants from 5 continents and 30 countries. 
Three winners and 10 honourable mentions were awarded to the participants.
The jury in the 2015 edition consisted of:
 Maria Aiolova
 Marc Fornes
 Chris Bosse
 Peter Kuczia
 Guy Hoffman
 Dave Pigram
 Giacomo Costa

2016 edition 
Registration for the competition is open until November 1, 2016. The project submission deadline is November 1, 2016. The winners will be announced on December 1, 2016.
The jury in the 2016 edition will consist of:
 Qun Dang, architect from MAD Architects, educator, "Shanshui City" design philosophy practitioner,
 Nathalie de Vries, architect, urban planner, MVRDV co-founder, educator, chair of the Royal Institute of Dutch Architects,
 Tobias Wallisser, architect, Laboratory for Visionary Architecture co-founder, educator,
 Ana María Gutiérrez, architect, Fundacion Organizmo co-founder,
 Julien De Smedt, architect, founder of JDS Architects, educator, winner of numerous awards in architecture,
 Peter Kuczia, architect, CO2 Saver House designer, educator, winner of numerous awards in architecture,
 Arturo Vittori, architect, Warka Water NGO co-founder, Architecture and Vision director, educator, awarded numerous prizes in architecture.

Laka Accelerator 
Laka Accelerator is a term for a network of international partners of Laka Architektura, who can offer the competition participants an additional distinction by helping them in the investigation and implementation of selected designs submitted to the competition. Their role is to provide professional consulting, international press coverage, as well as financial and substantial support of sponsors. 
The additional prize, which is the possibility of being considered by the Acceleration Partners, will be introduced in the next editions of the competition and is separate from the process of choosing the winners.
The partners of the Laka Competition and Laka Accelerator are among others:
 Technology Exchange Lab
 The Buckminster Fuller Institute
 Fundación Organizmo
 Katerva
 Peace and Collaborative Development Network
 Biomimicry Institute

References 

Architectural competitions